is a railway station on the Iida Line in the city of Komagane, Nagano Prefecture, Japan, operated by Central Japan Railway Company (JR Central).

Lines
Komagane Station is served by the Iida Line and is 165.6 kilometers from the starting point of the line at Toyohashi Station.

Station layout
The station consists of one ground-level side platform and one island platform serving three tracks.

Platforms

Adjacent stations

History
It was renamed Komagane on 1 October 1959. The present station building was completed in 1980. With the privatization of Japanese National Railways (JNR) on 1 April 1987, the station came under the control of JR Central.

In fiscal 2015, the station was used by an average of 526 passengers daily (boarding passengers only).

Surrounding area
Komagatake Ropeway

See also
 List of railway stations in Japan

References

External links

 Komagane Station information 

Railway stations in Nagano Prefecture
Railway stations in Japan opened in 1914
Stations of Central Japan Railway Company
Iida Line
Komagane, Nagano